Waidmannsfeld is a municipality in the Wiener Neustadt-Land District, Lower Austria, Austria. The forested portion of the municipality amounts to 77.9% of its area.  Waidmannsfeld consists of the cadastral communities Neusiedl and Waidmannsfeld.

Population

Economy

In 1999 there were 34 companies with agricultural or forestry related activities. In 2001 there were 51 jobs apart from agriculture, and 790 persons were employed. The activity rate was 45.04% in 2001.

References

External links

Cities and towns in Wiener Neustadt-Land District